The 1908 Home Nations Championship was the twenty-sixth series of the rugby union Home Nations Championship. Six matches were played between 18 January and 21 March. It was contested by England, Ireland, Scotland and Wales.

Although not officially part of the tournament until 1910, matches were arranged with the French national team which were played during the Championship. During the 1908 Championship, two Home Nations faced France, England and Wales. As Wales beat all three Home Nation opponents and France, they not only took the Triple Crown but were the winners of the Championship's first Grand Slam.

Table

Scoring system
The matches for this season were decided on points scored. A try was worth three points, while converting a kicked goal from the try gave an additional two points. A dropped goal was worth four points, while a goal from mark and penalty goals were worth three points.

Results

Additional matches outside the Championship

The matches

England vs. Wales

England: AE Wood (Gloucester), WN Lapage (United Services), JGG Birkett (Harlequins) capt., D Lambert (Harlequins), A Hudson (Gloucester), J Peters (Plymouth), RH Williamson (Oxford University), R Gilbert (Devonport Albion), F Boylen (Hartlepool Rovers), GD Roberts (Harlequins), CEL Hammond (Harlequins), LAN Slocock (Liverpool), WA Mills (Devonport Albion), H Havelock (Hartlepool Rovers), Robert Dibble (Bridgwater & Albion)

Wales: Bert Winfield (Cardiff), Johnnie Williams (Cardiff), Billy Trew (Swansea), Rhys Gabe (Cardiff), Reggie Gibbs (Cardiff), Percy Bush (Cardiff), Tommy Vile (Newport), James Watts (Llanelli), George Travers (Pill Harriers), Charlie Pritchard (Newport), John Alf Brown (Cardiff), Billy O'Neill (Cardiff), Jim Webb (Abertillery), William Dowell (Newport), Arthur Harding (Swansea) capt.

Wales vs. Scotland

Wales: Bert Winfield (Cardiff), Johnnie Williams (Cardiff), Billy Trew (Swansea), Rhys Gabe (Cardiff), Reggie Gibbs (Cardiff), Percy Bush (Cardiff), Tommy Vile (Newport), James Watts (Llanelli), George Travers (Pill Harriers) capt., George Hayward (Swansea), John Alf Brown (Cardiff), Billy O'Neill (Cardiff), Jim Webb (Abertillery), William Dowell (Newport), Arthur Harding (Swansea)

Scotland: DG Schulze (Royal Navy College, Dartmouth), T Sloan (London Scottish), H Martin (Oxford University), MW Walter (London Scottish), ABHL Purves (London Scottish), LL Greig (US Portsmouth) capt., George Cunningham (Oxford University), IC Geddes (London Scottish), JA Brown (Glasgow Acads), GM Frew (Glasgow HSFP), JC MacCallum (Watsonians), LM Speirs (Watsonians), GC Gowlland (London Scottish), Bedell-Sivright (Edinburgh University), JMB Scott (Edinburgh Acads.)

England vs. Ireland

England: AE Wood (Gloucester), WN Lapage (United Services), JGG Birkett (Harlequins), Henry Vassall (Oxford University), A Hudson (Gloucester), GV Portus (Blackheath), RH Williamson (Oxford University), R Gilbert (Devonport Albion), F Boylen (Hartlepool Rovers), TS Kelly (Exeter), CEL Hammond (Harlequins) capt., LAN Slocock (Liverpool), John Hopley (Blackheath), H Havelock (Hartlepool Rovers), Robert Dibble (Bridgwater & Albion)

Ireland: WP Hinton (Old Wesley), GGP Beckett (Dublin University), C Thompson (Belfast Collegians), James Cecil Parke (Dublin University), HB Thrift (Dublin University) capt., Herbert Aston (Dublin University), FNB Smartt (Dublin University), Bethel Solomons (Dublin University), Tommy Smyth (Malone), C Adams (Old Wesley), A Tedford (Malone), HG Wilson (Malone), E McG Morphy (Dublin University), TG Harpur (Dublin University), GT Hamlet (Old Wesley)

Ireland vs. Scotland

Ireland: WP Hinton (Old Wesley), GGP Beckett (Dublin University), C Thompson (Belfast Collegians), James Cecil Parke (Dublin University) capt., HB Thrift (Dublin University), ED Caddell (Wanderers), FNB Smartt (Dublin University), Bethel Solomons (Dublin University), Tommy Smyth (Malone), F Gardiner (NIFC), A Tedford (Malone), HG Wilson (Malone), EHJ Knox (Lansdowne), TG Harpur (Dublin University), GT Hamlet (Old Wesley)

Scotland: DG Schulze (Royal Navy College, Dartmouth), KG McLeod (Cambridge University), H Martin (Oxford University), MW Walter (London Scottish), ABHL Purves (London Scottish), LL Greig (US Portsmouth) capt., George Cunningham (Oxford University), JS Wilson (London Scottish), JA Brown (Glasgow Acads), GM Frew (Glasgow HSFP), JC MacCallum (Watsonians), LM Speirs (Watsonians), GA Sanderson (Royal HSFP), Bedell-Sivright (Edinburgh University), JMB Scott (Edinburgh Acads.)

Ireland vs. Wales

Ireland: WP Hinton (Old Wesley), GGP Beckett (Dublin University), C Thompson (Belfast Collegians), James Cecil Parke (Dublin University) capt., HB Thrift (Dublin University), ED Caddell (Wanderers), Herbert Aston (Dublin University), Bethel Solomons (Dublin University), Tommy Smyth (Malone), F Gardiner (NIFC), A Tedford (Malone), HG Wilson (Malone), JJ Coffey (Lansdowne), TG Harpur (Dublin University), GT Hamlet (Old Wesley)

Wales: Bert Winfield (Cardiff) capt., Johnnie Williams (Cardiff), Billy Trew (Swansea), Rhys Gabe (Cardiff), Reggie Gibbs (Cardiff), Dick Jones (Swansea), Dicky Owen (Swansea), James Watts (Llanelli), George Travers (Pill Harriers), George Hayward (Swansea), Tom Evans (Llanelli), Billy O'Neill (Cardiff), Jim Webb (Abertillery), William Dowell (Newport), Dick Thomas (Mountain Ash)

Scotland vs. England

Scotland: DG Schulze (Royal Navy College, Dartmouth), KG McLeod (Cambridge University), H Martin (Oxford University), CM Gilray (London Scottish), ABHL Purves (London Scottish), AL Wade (London Scottish), J Robertson (Clydesdale), IC Geddes (London Scottish) capt., AL Robertson (London Scottish), GM Frew (Glasgow HSFP), JC MacCallum (Watsonians), LM Speirs (Watsonians), HG Monteith (London Scottish), WE Kyle (Hawick), JMB Scott (Edinburgh Acads.)

England: GH D'O Lyon (US Portsmouth), D Lambert (Harlequins), JGG Birkett (Harlequins), WN Lapage (United Services), A Hudson (Gloucester), J Davey (Redruth), RH Williamson (Oxford University), R Gilbert (Devonport Albion), F Boylen (Hartlepool Rovers), TS Kelly (Exeter), Tommy Woods (Bridgwater & Albion), LAN Slocock (Liverpool) capt., WL Oldham (Coventry), FB Watson (US Portsmouth), Robert Dibble (Bridgwater & Albion)

French matches

France vs. England

France: H Issac (Racing Club de France), C Varseilles (Stade Français), R Sagot (Stade Français), E Lesieur (Stade Français), Gaston Lane (Racing Club de France), A Hubert (Association Sportive Français), A Mayssonnie (Toulouse), G Borchard (Racing Club de France, P Guillemin (Racing Club de France), P Mauriat (Lyon), H Moure (Universite de France), R de Malmann (Racing Club de France), Marcel Communeau (Stade Français) capt., C Beaurin (Stade Français), R Duval (Racing Club de France)

England: AE Wood (Gloucester), WN Lapage (United Services), JGG Birkett (Harlequins), D Lambert (Harlequins), A Hudson (Gloucester), GV Portus (Blackheath), HJH Sibree (Harlequins), EL Chambers (Bedford), F Boylen (Hartlepool Rovers), GD Roberts (Harlequins), TS Kelly (Exeter) capt., LAN Slocock (Liverpool), WA Mills (Devonport Albion), H Havelock (Hartlepool Rovers), Robert Dibble (Bridgwater & Albion)

Wales vs. France

Wales: Bert Winfield (Cardiff), Teddy Morgan (London Welsh) capt., Billy Trew (Swansea), Rhys Gabe (Cardiff), Reggie Gibbs (Cardiff), Dick Jones (Swansea), Dicky Owen (Swansea), James Watts (Llanelli), George Travers (Pill Harriers), George Hayward (Swansea), John Alf Brown (Cardiff), Billy O'Neill (Cardiff), Jim Webb (Abertillery), William Dowell (Newport), Dick Thomas (Mountain Ash)

France: H Martin (Stade Bordelais Universitaire), C Varseilles (Stade Français), Maurice Leuvielle (Stade Bordelais), E Lesieur (Stade Français), Gaston Lane (Racing Club de France), A Hubert (Association Sportive Français), A Mayssonnie (Toulouse), A Masse (Stade Bordelais Universitaire), P Guillemin (Racing Club de France), P Mauriat (Lyon), A Branlat (Racing Club de France), R de Malmann (Racing Club de France), Marcel Communeau (Stade Français) capt., J Dufourcq (Stade Bordelais Universitaire), R Duval (Racing Club de France)

Bibliography

External links

1907-08
1908 rugby union tournaments for national teams
1907–08 in British rugby union
1907–08 in English rugby union
rugby union
1907–08 in Welsh rugby union 
1907–08 in Scottish rugby union 
Home Nations Championship
Home Nations Championship
Home Nations Championship